Boyuk Alagol is a lake in the Kalbajar District of Azerbaijan. It is located on the Karabakh volcanic plateau. The lake came under the occupation of Armenian forces following the First Nagorno-Karabakh war and was administrated as part of the Shahumyan Province of the self-proclaimed Republic of Artsakh. The Kalbajar District, along with the lake were returned to Azerbaijan on 25 November 2020 per the 2020 Nagorno-Karabakh ceasefire agreement.

Gallery

References

External links
Satellite view of Boyuk Alagol

Lakes of Azerbaijan
Bodies of water of the Republic of Artsakh